Frontini is an Italian surname. Notable people with the surname include:

Carlos Esteban Frontini (born 1981), Argentine footballer
Francesco Paolo Frontini (1860–1939), Italian classical composer
Martino Frontini (1827–1909), Italian composer
Pablo Frontini (born 1984), Argentine footballer

Italian-language surnames